Pseudominolia musiva is a species of sea snail, a marine gastropod mollusk in the family Trochidae, the top snails.

Description
The height of the shell varies between 4 mm and 4½ mm, its diameter between 3½ and 4 mm. The small, thin shell is narrowly but deeply perforate. It has a conical-turreted shape. It is lusterless, whitish, mottled with greenish-brown above. Its base is densely marked with dark brownish or greenish. The spire is elevated with an acute, yellowish apex. The sutures are profound. The shell contains five whorls.  The median portion is encircled by three prominent keels, the upper two visible on the spire. The oblique striae of increment are scarcely visible. The base of the shell contains a few coarse but not deep spiral sulci, carinated around the funnel-shaped umbilicus. The aperture is subcircular, iridescent within. The outer lip is fragile. The thin columella is concave. The umbilicus contains several obscure spiral sulci inside.

Distribution
This species occurs in the Red Sea, the Mediterranean, and off the Philippines, Sri Lanka and Singapore.

References

 G. & H. Nevill (1871), Descriptions of new Mollusca from the Eastern Regions; The Journal of Asiatic Society of Bengal v. 40 (1871)
 Poppe G.T., Tagaro S.P. & Dekker H. (2006) The Seguenziidae, Chilodontidae, Trochidae, Calliostomatidae and Solariellidae of the Philippine Islands. Visaya Supplement 2: 1–228-page(s): 109

External links
 

 musiva
Gastropods described in 1871